Office Party, also known as Hostile Takeover in some releases, is a Canadian thriller film directed by George Mihalka and released in 1988. An adaptation of Michael A. Gilbert's 1981 crime novel Office Party, the film stars David Warner as Eugene Brackin, a repressed accountant who suddenly takes three of his coworkers hostage with no apparent motive or demands.

The film also stars Michael Ironside, Kate Vernon and Jayne Eastwood as the hostages.

Billy Bryans and Aaron Davis received a Genie Award nomination for Best Original Score at the 10th Genie Awards.

Cast 
 David Warner - Eugene Brackin
 Michael Ironside - Larry Gaylord
 Kate Vernon - Sally
 Jayne Eastwood - Joan Talmage
 Will Lyman - Smolen
 Graeme Campbell - Hollis
 Anthony Sherwood - Garlas
 John Vernon - Mayor
 Patrick Patterson - Security Guard
 Winston Gaddishaw - Marksman
 Helen Beavis - Mrs. Hampton
 Cindy Girling - Mrs. Gaylord
 Kenneth McGregor - Cop #1 (as Ken McGregor)
 François Klanfer - NY Boss
 Rex Hagon - V.P. of Felton

References

External links 
 

1988 films
Canadian thriller films
English-language Canadian films
Films directed by George Mihalka
Films based on Canadian novels
1980s English-language films
1980s Canadian films